A king Bhagadatta is reported in a Khmer inscription dated 937 
as the spring of a line of princes of Chanasapura in Dvaravati in what is now Thailand.

Bibliography

References

Dvaravati
10th-century monarchs in Asia
Thai monarchs